Klaus Henrikinpoika, lord of Joensuu and Kankainen (c. 1445 – 1520) was in his time one of the most influential magnates in Finland (then a part of Sweden). As keystone of  his career, he received the justiciarship of Southern Finland which he held from 1487 to 1520. He was the first male member of his agnatic house to rise to great prominence in his country.

The only surviving son of squire Henrikki Ollinpoika, lord of Joensuu, and his wife  (Silja) Laavuntytär of Nyynäinen, heiress of Kankainen manor, he was born in about 1445 or a bit earlier.
In his lifetime, no surname was used of him and his family.
His forefathers were squire-class noblemen in Finland already in the 14th century (confirmation in 1407 from King Eric XIII) and their family crest depicts 'Drinking Horn'. On the other side, his maternal grandfather (sir Klaus 'djekn' Lyderinpoika) had been as long as for almost two decades (1416..1434) the Castellan of Turku, the regional capital of all Western Finland, and became quite wealthy, so the maternal grandfather's children inherited good fortunes each. Klaus' mother brought the big estate of Kankainen in Masku of southwestern Finland to their own family. Klaus was named after his successful maternal grandfather.

From his father Klaus  inherited the Joensuu manor in Halikko, southwestern Finland. Later in life, Klaus inherited Kankainen manor from his sister. Klaus' first wife brought some rights to the manor of Haapaniemi in Kisko to the family, and apparently Klaus purchased other heirs out of that inheritance.

All in all, towards the end of is life, lord Klaus was one of biggest and wealthiest landowners in Finland.

Klaus' second wife inherited several farms in her home district, Vehkalahti, which belonged to the Margraviate of Viipuri (Vyborg).

In 1472, squire Klaus became the district judge of Halikko, the district where his ancestral manor of Joensuu is located. In this position he was successor to his father-in-law, the justiciar 'Kristo' Frille.
lord Klaus was the justiciar of Southern Finland  as long as over three decades: 1487..1520. Up to 1472, also that office had been held by his father-in-law, 'Kristo' Frille. This position was the most important one in all the judiciary of Finland.

From 1488 to his death, lord Klaus was High Councillor of the Realm. In the 1490s, lord Klaus of Joensuu was one of the most important leaders of negotiations about defence against the Russians. In the 16th century, the Danish became a threat, and in 1407 lord Klaus of Joensuu was mentioned as one of  leaders of negotiations about defence against the Danes.

In 1511, the elderly lord Klaus of Joensuu (already in his sixties) was deemed suitable yet and sent to act as commander and administrator in Viipuri, the fief (margraviate) which was at the time in the transition under the Dowager Margravine Gunilla, widow of the recently deceased castellan and margrave Eerikki Tuurenpoika. Vyborg Castle was effectively the regional capital of Eastern Finland, and more importantly, the cornerstone and key stronghold against the Russians.

Family 
In 1470, young lord Klaus received a papal dispensation for his marriage with lady Kristiina Kristontytär Frille, co-heiress of Teijo and Haapaniemi (b bef c1455; d bef 1508), who was daughter of a second cousin of Klaus' and of the high councillor Krister Frille, justiciar of Southern Finland.

After the death of lady Kristiina, Klaus married anew, in c1511, presumably somewhere in the region of Viipuri, where he acted at the time as commander of the Viipuri castle and an administrator of the province. The new wife was the much younger lady Kirsti of Salmenkylä, heiress of Töytärinhovi and of several farms in Salmenkylä, Sivatti, Pyöli, Husupyöli, Teinpyöli, Reitkalli and Hietakylä of Vehkalahti district, as well as of houses in at least in  Hietakylä local harbor and in Salmenkylä.
Klaus' widow, lady Kirsti of Salmenkylä (b bef 1495; dc1553), lived long after her first husband, was Dowager of Haapaniemi where she usually resided, and in c1531 married anew.

According to research of the historian Kaarlo Blomqvist, the most likely time of the death of lord Klaus of Joensuu was the Summer 1520.

At least three of his children have descendants. The son (castellan Kristo) and daughter (lady Piriitta/Kirsti) of his first marriage do, as well as does the only child of his second marriage, his youngest son, knight Henrikki Laavunpoika of Kankainen (bc 1512; d 1595).
These two mentioned sons (Kristo and Henrikki) each founded one of the two main branches of the family: that of Joensuu and that of Kankainen.

References
Blomstedt, Kaarlo (1921) Henrik Klaunpoika Horn - Ajankuvaus, I. Kustaa Vaasan ja Juhana herttuan palveluksessa. 1921. 544 pages.
Elgenstierna, Gustaf:  ättartavlor ... introducerade adeln, vol III
Sjöström (2011), "Medieval landed inheritances of the Junkar and Vilken lineages of Vehkalahti, Finland", Foundations: Journal of the Foundation for Medieval Genealogy, vol 3 issue 5 (January 2011), pp 425–461

15th-century Finnish nobility
1445 births
1520 deaths
16th-century Finnish nobility
15th-century Swedish nobility